LC 43 or LC-43 is a designation used for several launch complexes:

 Cape Canaveral Launch Complex 43
 Plesetsk Cosmodrome Site 43
 Jiuquan Launch Area 4